Antillesoma antillarum is the type species of the peanut worm genus Antillesoma. The genus belongs to the family Phascolosomatidae.

Synonymy 
 Aspidosiphon mokyevskii (Murina, 1964)  
 Golfingia (Thysanocardia) mokyevskii Murina, 1964  
 Golfingia mokyevskii Murina, 1964  
 Phascolion antillarum  
 Phascolosoma (Aedematosomum) antillarum Grube, 1858  
 Phascolosoma (Antillesoma) antillarum Grube, 1858  
 Phascolosoma (Antillesoma) asser (Selenka & De Man, 1883)  
 Phascolosoma (Antillesoma) pelmum  (Selenka & De Man, 1883)  
 Phascolosoma (Antillesoma) schmidti Murina, 1975  
 Phascolosoma (Rueppellisoma) gaudens (Lanchester, 1905)  
 Phascolosoma (Rueppellisoma) onomichianum (Ikeda, 1904)  
 Phascolosoma (Rueppellisoma) simile (Chen & Yeh, 1958)  
 Phascolosoma (Rueppellisoma) weldonii (Shipley, 1892)  
 Phascolosoma aethiops Baird, 1868  
 Phascolosoma antillarum Grube, 1858  
 Phascolosoma asser (Selenka & De Man, 1883)  
 Phascolosoma fuscum Keferstein, 1862  
 Phascolosoma glans (De Quatrefages, 1865)  
 Phascolosoma immodestum (De Quatrefages, 1865)  
 Phascolosoma nigriceps Baird, 1868  
 Phascolosoma onomichianum (Ikeda, 1904)  
 Phascolosoma pelma (Selenka & De Man, 1883)  
 Phascolosoma pelmum (Selenka & De Man, 1883)  
 Phascolosoma similis (Chen & Yeh, 1958)  
 Phymosoma antillarum (Grube, 1858)  
 Phymosoma asser Selenka & De Man, in Selenka, de Man & Bülow, 1883  
 Phymosoma onomichianum Ikeda, 1904  
 Phymosoma pelma Selenka & De Man, in Selenka, de Man & Bülow, 1883  
 Physcosoma antillarum (Grube, 1858)  
 Physcosoma asser (Selenka & De Man, 1883)  
 Physcosoma gaudens Lanchester, 1905  
 Physcosoma onomichianum (Ikeda, 1904)  
 Physcosoma pelma (Selenka & De Man, 1883)  
 Physcosoma similis Chen & Yeh, 1958  
 Physcosoma weldonii Shipley, 1892  
 Sipunculus (Aedematosomum) glans De Quatrefages, 1865  
 Sipunculus (Aedematosomum) immodestus De Quatrefages, 1865

Distribution
This species is considered a cosmopolitan species.  They are widespread in tropical and subtropical waters. It has been reported in the western Atlantic and the Caribbean from Florida to Brazil, in the eastern Atlantic in Sierra Leone.

Habitat
Antillesoma antillarum has been found inhabiting mollusc shell middens.  They accompany and associate with the following species of sipunculids: Aspidosiphon albus,   A. Parvulus, A. fischeri, Temistes lageniformis, y Nephasoma pellucidum.

References

External links

 Integrated Taxonomic Information System (ITIS): Antillesoma antillarum  (Grübe and Oersted, 1858) Taxonomic Serial No.: 772615
 National Centrer of Biotechnology Information (NCBI): Antillesoma antillarum Taxonomy ID: 210781
 Biodiversity Heritage Library (BHL): Antillesoma antillarum

Sipunculans
Animals described in 1858